Jadi Setiadi (born 2 February 1985, in Pringsewu, Lampung) is an Indonesian weightlifter. He competed at the 2012 Summer Olympics in the Men's 56 kg, finishing 5th.  He had previously competed in the same weight division at the 2004 Summer Olympics, finishing in 8th.

References

Indonesian male weightlifters
1985 births
Living people
Olympic weightlifters of Indonesia
Weightlifters at the 2004 Summer Olympics
Weightlifters at the 2012 Summer Olympics
Asian Games medalists in weightlifting
Weightlifters at the 2002 Asian Games
Weightlifters at the 2010 Asian Games
Asian Games bronze medalists for Indonesia
Medalists at the 2010 Asian Games
People from Pringsewu Regency
Sportspeople from Lampung
Southeast Asian Games gold medalists for Indonesia
Southeast Asian Games silver medalists for Indonesia
Southeast Asian Games medalists in weightlifting
Competitors at the 2001 Southeast Asian Games
20th-century Indonesian people
21st-century Indonesian people